Lloyd Island is an island in the Aboriginal Shire of Lockhart River, Queensland, Australia.

Geography 

Lloyd Island is part of the Great Barrier Reef Marine Park in Lloyd Bay between Lockhart River and Cape Direction.

Lloyd Island is a popular subject for Aboriginal artists such as Adrian King.

References

Islands on the Great Barrier Reef
Uninhabited islands of Australia
Islands of Far North Queensland
Great Barrier Reef Marine Park
Aboriginal Shire of Lockhart River